Lightyear (Original Motion Picture Soundtrack) is the soundtrack album to the 2022 Disney/Pixar film of the same name. The score is composed by Michael Giacchino, in his eighth Pixar film as well as his 50th film as a film score composer. Giacchino stated that the score is a blend of several works based on space opera in various formats, and he experienced in his childhood period. The scoring was held remotely during the COVID-19 pandemic at the Eastwood Scoring Stage and Newman Scoring Stage in Los Angeles for 15 days which required a 39-member choir and 89-member orchestra.

A track "Mission Perpetual" was released as a single on June 3, 2022, and the score album was released in Dolby Atmos by Walt Disney Records on June 17, 2022. The score received positive critical reviews, praising Giacchino's compositions.

Production

Background 

On January 25, 2022, Michael Giacchino was announced to compose the film's score. It eventually marked his first Toy Story-based theatrical feature, after previously scoring for the television specials based on the franchise, Toy Story of Terror! (2013) and Toy Story That Time Forgot (2014), the former was directed by Angus MacLane, and is the second time, Giacchino eventually scored for an instalment that was previously composed by Randy Newman after Cars 2 (2011). He stated the score is a blend of all the space opera films and television shows, including Star Trek, Star Wars and Alien franchise.

Giacchino said that creating the film score was more about thinking about the science-fiction and adventure movies that he grew up loving. Through this score, he wanted kids in the current generation to experience the way, he had during his childhood.

Giacchino stated that the score made references to his earlier work, including a nod to the television series Star Trek in the first five minutes. On using the references, Giacchino said "At some point, you put it out there. It's for fun; let's just see if they notice, and they do. But there's always a reason for the connections. If I do that, there's always a thematic reason for it. It's never just because; there's always a reason behind it."

Recording 
The scoring was held at the Eastwood Scoring Stage and Newman Scoring Stage in Los Angeles, mostly during the COVID-19 lockdown period in late-2021. 39 vocalists from Los Angeles Master Chorale and 89 musicians from the Los Angeles Philharmonic Orchestra, worked on the choral and orchestral pieces used in the score. The recording was split into multiple sessions. Giacchino had to record the orchestral pieces separately, as he could not bring the ensemble together due to lockdown restrictions. The musicians had to be separated by 6 to 10 feet distance while recording, and had to manually record the score on a day basis. By this, Giacchino took about 15–18 days on working on the score, as normally, he would finish scoring for a film within 5 days. He also faced several challenges during recording, with woodwinds had to be placed in plastic boxes in front of them and brass instruments being surrounded in plastic shower curtains, as a result, "the musicians could not hear each other while recording or even notice their body language".

Release 
"Mission Perpetual", a track from the score album was released as a single on June 3, 2022. Commenting on the track, Giacchino stated it as one of his favourite tracks to work on the film, while further saying in an interview to Variety: "It was an exciting challenge to work for me because there were so many things the music needed to convey: Buzz’s frustration with himself and the sadness of being alone in his pursuit, but also his undying ambition and drive to achieve his goal." He opined that, he went through a similar "mission" on the track, which was "incredibly rewarding". The album was released through Dolby Atmos on June 17, 2022, by Walt Disney Records.

Reception 
The score was positively received by critics and was acclaimed in the film reviews. David Rooney of The Hollywood Reporter stated Giacchino's "robust orchestral score", ranges from "quiet, intimate moments through hard-charging suspense to triumphal jubilation". RogerEbert.com-based critic Odie Henderson called it as "one of Giacchino's best scores" and "a delectable spoof of bombastic space movie music that elevates every scene it plays under". He further added that, the composition in the film's opening scene, was reminiscent of his work similar to the opening sequence in Up (2009), which fetched him the Academy Award for Best Original Score.

Star Tribune-based Chris Hewitt stated the score as "sensitive". Dana Stevens of Slate complimented "Giacchino’s score soars movingly or bounces merrily as required by the story". In a more contrasting review, The Denver Post's John Wenzel, though calling the score as "stirring", had attributed that "it never justifies beyond commercial expansion". DiscussingFilm's Aaron Escobar wrote "Giacchino produces a score for the hero that might sound a little familiar to fans of the Toy Story series, though in actuality, is made completely from scratch. Giacchino creates a brass-infused theme that with each build-up makes the viewer want to buckle up next to these Space Rangers for the ride ahead, proving once again what a good luck charm he’s become for Pixar."

About the first track "Mission Perpetual", Collider's Ryan O'Rourke had stated "The track fits the vibe of a grand space adventure, sounding like the background music to the start of a mission to the stars. With how it swells and dips, it represents the possible success and failure Buzz and company could face. For as whimsical as it is and how much it builds towards its energetic end, there are some darker notes throughout that could indicate the danger of the mission and general fear and frustration over failure."

Track listing 
All tracks are written and composed by Michael Giacchino.

Additional music 
The track "Starman" by David Bowie was featured in the first trailer of the film, and The Black Keys' "Lonely Boy" was featured in the special look trailer. The tracks were used for promotional purposes, and was neither featured in the soundtrack, nor in the film.

Chart performance

Personnel 
Credits adapted from Spotify.
 Marshall Bowen – orchestra conductor
 Connie Boylan – assistant orchestra contractor, assistant score contractor
 Aleta Braxton – score vocalist
 Warren Brown – score mixing
 Reid Bruton – score vocalist
 Amick Byram – score vocalist
 Alvin Chea – score vocalist
 Stephen M. Davis – music editor
 George Doering – guitar
 Monique Donnelly – score vocalist
 Dylan Gentile – score vocalist
 William Kenneth Goldman – score vocalist
 Curtis Green – additional music
 Emma Gunn – score vocalist
 Levi Gunn – score vocalist
 Vangie Gunn – vocal contractor, soloist, choir conductor
 Christine Guter – score vocalist
 Tom Hardisty – score recordist
 Ayana Haviv – score vocalist
 Jeff Kryka – orchestrator
 Keri Larson – score vocalist
 William Wells Learned III – music editor
 Edie Lehmann Boddicker – score vocalist
 Mark LeVang – piano, celeste
 Ben Han-Wei Lin – score vocalist
 Rick Logan – score vocalist
 David Loucks – score vocalist
 Tom MacDougall – executive music producer
 Sara Mann – score vocalist
 Baraka May – score vocalist
 Tonoccus McClain – score vocalist
 Martin McClellan – music preparation
 Claude McKnight – score vocalist
 Aaron Meyer – music preparation
 Charissa Nielsen – score vocalist
 Pedro Osuna–orchestrator
 Jasper Randall – score vocalist
 Erin Michael Rettig – scoring stage engineer
 Hannah Marie Ruston – score vocalist
 Ann Marie Sheridan – score vocalist
 Fletcher Sheridan – score vocalist
 Connor Warren Smith – score vocalist
 Beinn-Mhor Logan Stewart – score vocalist
 Joe Stone–oboe and English horn
 Todd Strange – score vocalist
 Ellena Taylor – score vocalist
 Natalie Babbitt Taylor – score vocalist
 Andrew James Thomas – score vocalist
 Suzanne Waters – score vocalist
 John West – score vocalist
 Greg Whipple – score vocalist
 Booker White – music preparation
 Gerald White–score vocalist
 Elyse Willis–score vocalist
 Reggie Wilson – orchestra contractor, score contractor

References 

2022 soundtrack albums
Animated film soundtracks
Pixar soundtracks
Walt Disney Records soundtracks
Michael Giacchino soundtracks
Electronic soundtracks